Richard John Edward Patterson (born 30 April 1983) is a weightlifting competitor for New Zealand.

At the 2010 Commonwealth Games in Delhi he won the silver medal in the men's 85 kg weightlifting event. Four years later, at the 2014 Commonwealth Games in Glasgow, he won the gold medal in the same event.  He was New Zealand's flagbearer in the 2014 Commonwealth Games closing ceremony.

To qualify for the 2012 Summer Olympics Patterson had to rely on fellow New Zealand teammate Tavita Ngalu to lift 150 kg at the Oceania Championships. In a selfless act Ngalu did so while injured with ripped quadriceps and New Zealand's highest ranked weightlifter (Patterson) qualified for the Games.

Patterson married fellow weightlifter Phillipa Hale in Glasgow on 31 July 2014, after both had competed in the Commonwealth Games (Hale competed in the women's 53 kg event).

Major results

References

External links

Living people
1983 births
New Zealand male weightlifters
Commonwealth Games gold medallists for New Zealand
Commonwealth Games silver medallists for New Zealand
Weightlifters at the 2010 Commonwealth Games
Olympic weightlifters of New Zealand
Weightlifters at the 2008 Summer Olympics
Weightlifters at the 2012 Summer Olympics
Weightlifters at the 2014 Commonwealth Games
Weightlifters at the 2016 Summer Olympics
Commonwealth Games medallists in weightlifting
20th-century New Zealand people
21st-century New Zealand people
Medallists at the 2014 Commonwealth Games